The 1976 Australia rugby union tour of Europe was a series of ten matches played by the Australia national rugby union team (the Wallabies) in France and Italy in October and November 1976.
The Wallabies won four and lost six of their matches; they lost both of their international matches against France in Bordeaux and Paris but won the international against Italy.

Australia did not award full international caps for the match against Italy while Italy did.
The match was played at Arena Civica in Milan and was narrowly won by the Australians by one point, 16-15.

Matches 
Scores and results list Australia's points tally first.

References

Notes 

1976 rugby union tours
1976
1976
1976
1976 in Australian rugby union
1976–77 in European rugby union
1976–77 in French rugby union
1976 in Italian sport